Mister Roberts is a 1955 American Warnercolor in CinemaScope comedy-drama film directed by John Ford and Mervyn LeRoy starring an all-star cast including Henry Fonda as Mister Roberts, James Cagney as Captain Morton, William Powell (in his final film appearance) as Doc, and Jack Lemmon as Ensign Pulver. Based on the 1946 novel and 1948 Broadway play, the film was nominated for three Academy Awards, including Best Picture and Best Sound, Recording (William A. Mueller), with Jack Lemmon winning the award for Best Supporting Actor.

Plot
In the waning days of World War II, the U.S. cargo ship Reluctant (also called “The Bucket”) and her crew are stationed in the "backwater" areas of the Pacific Ocean. The executive officer/cargo chief, Lieutenant (junior grade) Douglas A. "Doug" Roberts, shields the dispirited crew from the harsh and unpopular captain, Lieutenant Commander Morton. Eager to join the fighting, Roberts repeatedly requests a transfer. Morton is forced by regulation to forward his requests, but refuses to endorse them, resulting in their being rejected. Roberts shares quarters with Ensign Frank Thurlowe Pulver, the laundry and morale officer. Pulver spends most of his time idling in his bunk and avoiding the captain, so much so, that Morton is initially unaware that Pulver is a crew member. Once discovered, Pulver cowers before Morton despite bold (and never realized) ideas for revenge he expresses to the crew.

Roberts surreptitiously requests and is granted crew liberty from one of Morton’s superiors, a port captain who wishes to reward the Reluctants crew for meeting a difficult resupply schedule. The liberty is supposed to be at their next resupply stop, but when the ship reaches an idyllic South Pacific island, Morton cancels the crew's much-needed shore leave. In private, Morton tells Roberts that the crew will be denied liberty as long as he continues to request a transfer and writes letters regarding disharmony aboard the ship, which is hurting Morton's promotion chances. Morton strikes a bargain with Roberts: In exchange for never requesting another transfer, never resisting Morton's rules, and never revealing why he changed his attitude, Morton will grant the crew liberty.

Ashore, the crew releases months of pent-up frustration, with many arrested and hauled back to the ship by the military police and the shore patrol. The next morning, Morton is reprimanded by the port captain and ordered to leave port immediately. Morton is livid at the black mark on his sterling record.

Meanwhile, the crew is mystified by Roberts’ new strictness and deference to the captain. Morton deceives them into believing Roberts is vying for a promotion. When a crew member informs Roberts of a new Navy policy which could help him receive a transfer despite the captain's opposition, Roberts declines.

News of the Allied victory in Europe depresses Roberts further, knowing the war may end soon without his ever seeing combat. Inspired by a patriotic radio speech celebrating VE Day, Roberts tosses Morton's prized palm tree overboard. The captain demands the identity of the culprit, but no one steps forward. He eventually realizes it was likely Roberts and summons him to his quarters and accuses him of the deed. An open microphone allows the crew to overhear their heated conversation and why Roberts changed.

Weeks later, Roberts receives an unexpected transfer. "Doc," the ship's doctor and Roberts' friend, confides to him that the crew risked court-martial by submitting a transfer request with Morton's forged signature of approval. Before he leaves, the crew presents Roberts with a handmade medal, the Order of the Palm, for "action against the enemy."

Several weeks later, Pulver, who has been appointed cargo officer, receives several letters. The first is from Roberts, who enthusiastically writes about his new assignment aboard the destroyer USS Livingston during the Battle of Okinawa. He writes he would rather have the Order of the Palm than the Congressional Medal of Honor. The second letter is from Pulver's college friend who is also a junior naval officer assigned to the Livingston. He reveals that Roberts was killed in a kamikaze attack shortly after the first letter had been posted.

Incensed, Pulver throws the captain’s replacement palm tree overboard, then marches into Morton's cabin, openly bragging that he is responsible. He brazenly demands to know why Morton has cancelled the showing of a film that night. Morton slowly shakes his head, realizing his problems have not gone away.

Cast

 Henry Fonda as Lieutenant (junior grade) Douglas A. "Doug" Roberts
 James Cagney as Lieutenant Commander "Captain" Morton
 William Powell as "Doc"
 Jack Lemmon as Ensign Frank Thurlowe Pulver
 Betsy Palmer as Lieutenant Ann Girard
 Ward Bond as Chief Petty Officer Dowdy
 Ken Curtis as Dolan
 Philip Carey as Mannion (billed as Phil Carey)
 Nick Adams as Reber
 Perry Lopez as Rodrigues
 Robert Roark as Insigna
 Harry Carey Jr. as Stefanowski
 Patrick Wayne as Bookser
 Frank Aletter as Gerhart
 Tige Andrews as Wiley
 Martin Milner as Shore Patrol Officer
 Harry Tenbrook as Cookie 
 Kathleen O'Malley as Nurse
 Gregory Walcott as Shore Patrolman
 James Flavin as Military Policeman
 Jack Pennick as Marine Sergeant
 Duke Kahanamoku as Native Chief

Production
Fonda was not the original choice to star in the film version; Warner Bros. was considering William Holden or Marlon Brando for the role. The studio thought Fonda had been on stage and off the screen so long (eight years) that he was no longer a box office draw. In addition, when filming began he was 49, much older than the average lieutenant junior grade. Fonda was hired only because director John Ford insisted.

The movie was directed by John Ford, Mervyn LeRoy and Joshua Logan, who was uncredited. While directing the film, Ford had personality conflicts with Fonda and Cagney. When Ford met Cagney at the airport, the director warned that they would "tangle asses," which caught Cagney by surprise. Cagney later said, "I would have kicked his brains out. He was so goddamned mean to everybody. He was truly a nasty old man." The next day, Cagney was slightly late on set, and Ford became incensed. Cagney cut short the imminent tirade, saying, "When I started this picture, you said that we would tangle asses before this was over. I'm ready now – are you?" Ford backed down and walked away, and he and Cagney had no further conflicts on the set.

Nevertheless, Ford was replaced by LeRoy after difficulties with Fonda (Ford apparently punched Fonda in the jaw during a heated argument), and a gall bladder attack that necessitated emergency surgery. It has been widely speculated which scenes were directed by LeRoy. Jack Lemmon shed some light on this issue in his DVD commentary: "Mervyn LeRoy would watch all of the rushes that Ford had shot prior to his temporary departure and decided to shoot them the way John Ford would have shot 'em." Logan, who had directed the original stage production in which Fonda starred, re-shot major portions of the film, at Fonda's request.

The DVD release of this film includes an audio commentary by Lemmon in which he recounts stories of his experience making the film and his views on acting. During the production of the film, Lemmon began a long-term friendship with Cagney which continued until Cagney's death in 1986. Prior to his appearance in his first film, years before Mister Roberts, he started in live television. In one particular performance, Lemmon decided to play his character differently. He decided to play the character left-handed, which was opposite to his own handedness. With much practice, he pulled off the performance without anyone noticing the change. Even Lemmon's wife was fooled. A few years later, Lemmon met Cagney on their way to Midway Island to film Mister Roberts. Cagney asked, "Are you still fooling people into believing you're left-handed?" They had a great laugh and a strong friendship was born.

Fonda wrote in his 1982 autobiography, My Life, that he believed that as good as the movie is, the play is even better. Mister Roberts was William Powell's final acting appearance, although he lived nearly another 30 years, dying at age 91 in 1984. The film was also Cagney's last movie for Warner Bros., the studio that had propelled him to stardom in the 1930s and under which he had spent the majority of his career under contract.

USS Reluctant
The Navy vessel that played the role of USS Reluctant (AK-601), a.k.a. "the Bucket," in the movie's exterior shots was a former U.S. Army Freight and Passenger/Freight and Supply (FP/FS) vessel, which was originally commissioned in the Navy following World War II.  The  is credited by the Navy as the ship assigned to the filming. The official Navy history for the ship notes:

In late August 1954 Hewell departed Hawaii for Midway Island, mooring at the Naval Base there on 28 August to help film the Warner Brothers movie Mister Roberts. The film, starring Henry Fonda, James Cagney, William Powell and Jack Lemmon, was partially shot on board Hewell, with underway footage filmed off Midway Harbor between 1 and 16 September. The light cargo ship then sailed back to Hawaii between 24 and 29 September and additional film was shot off Kaneohe Bay between 30 September and 7 October.
 
A 1994 article which appeared in the newsletter of the Keyport, Washington Naval Undersea Warfare Center, contending that IX-308 (another Army FS vessel converted to a Navy AKL (light auxiliary cargo) and assigned torpedo recovery duties at Keyport) was used in filming of Mister Roberts and not Hewell, created a controversy.  That ship had been named  for its service out of that port serving the USAF Texas Towers radar facilities off the east coast of the United States.

All but one of the Navy's AKLs were built as U.S. Army FP/FS type cargo vessels transferred to the Navy. In the movie, Mr. Roberts says to Doc that there are "62 men" aboard which would have been far too many for an AKL.

A number of modifications to the AKL exterior appearance were made for the film. The "palm tree" was located on a "deck" built for the movie by extending the small deckhouse of the AKL and building movie set ladders to the bridge and main deck. The crew, when going below to their berthing compartment, are shown in the movie to be descending into the cargo hold.

Reception
The film was a financial success. It grossed $21.2 million, earning $8.5 million in US theatrical rentals.

Accolades

Television and sequels
Mister Roberts was followed by a film sequel, Ensign Pulver (1964), with Robert Walker Jr. starring as Pulver. It also starred Burl Ives as Captain Morton, Walter Matthau as Doc, and in small roles, Larry Hagman and Jack Nicholson, among others. Much of the screenplay was derived from Heggen's original book.

The original film was the basis of the 1965 TV series Mister Roberts, which lasted one season, and the film was remade for television in 1984 as a live telecast shot mostly in the form of a stage play.

References

Bibliography

External links 

 
 
 
 
 
 
 

1955 films
1955 comedy-drama films
American comedy-drama films
American films based on plays
Films scored by Franz Waxman
Films adapted into television shows
Films based on adaptations
Films based on American novels
Films about the United States Navy in World War II
Films directed by John Ford
Films directed by Mervyn LeRoy
Films featuring a Best Supporting Actor Academy Award-winning performance
Films set in the 1940s
Military humor in film
Pacific War films
Warner Bros. films
American World War II films
CinemaScope films
1950s English-language films
1950s American films